Hui Brothers Show is a Hong Kong sketch comedy television series produced by TVB and hosted by and starring brothers Michael Hui and Samuel Hui that ran for 54 episodes from 1971 to 1973.

The first episode of Hui Brothers Show was aired on 12 April 1971 as a special program to celebrate Easter and was very well received. As a result, TVB decided to turn it into a regular program which began airing its first season 11 days later on 23 April on Friday nights. The first season ended on 15 October 1971 with a total of 27 episodes including its first episode aired on Easter. The show featured a fresh style and exquisite content including machines gun delivery of jokes. After the end of the first season, audiences wrote letters to TVB requesting the extension of the show. As a result, the show was re-aired on Sunday mornings at the end of 1971.

The second season premiered on 14 April 1972. This season took inspiration from the American sketch comedy show, Laugh-In, featuring sitcom and Hong Kong English pop music sung by Samuel Hui. This season featured Samuel's famed Cantonese song, Tit Taap Ling Wan (鐵塔凌雲, literally translated as Steel Tower rise above the clouds), which featured lyrics written by Michael. Season 2 ended 6 October of the same year with a total of 26 episodes.

Four months later, the final episode of Hui Brothers Show was aired on 3 February 1973 as a special program to celebrate Chinese New Year.

Notable guest stars

Season 1 (1971)
Nancy Sit
Roy Chiao
Patrick Tse
Tang Pik-wan
Fung Tak-luk
Wu Yan-yan
Sai Gwa-Pau
Richard Ng
Stanley Fung
Leung Tin
Adam Cheng
Sylvia Lai
Cheung Ying
Josephine Siao
Lydia Shum
Maggie Li
Fung-wong Nui
Chu Mu
Chow Kat
Wong Oi-ming
Ma Siu-ying
Betty Chung
Yung Yuk-yee
Law Kwok-hung
Wong Wan-choi
Chan Lap-pan
Angela Mao
Mang Lei
Lee Sin-wan (Hui's mother)
Ricky Hui (Hui's brother)

Season 2 (1972)
Connie Chan
Lee Heung-kam
Tam Ping-man
Leung Sing-Bor
Rebecca Pan
Tina Leung
Roman Tam
Li Han-hsiang
Louise Lee
Benz Hui
Lisa Lui
Kwok Fung
Frances Yip
Chan Yau-hau
Lai Siu-fong
Yuen Man-lei
Patrick Lung
Hui Sau-ying
Ivan Ho
Lee Tim-sing
Leung Tin
Leung San
Siu San-yan
Bonnie Wong
Fong Ping
To Shu-ying
Kong Lai
Lee To Yat-hin

Finale (1973)
The Chopsticks
Cheng Pei-pei
Tina Leung
Roy Chiao

Songs
The end of each episode of the show featured a song sung by Samuel Hui accompanied with a music video.

I'll Never Fall in Love Again (co-sung with Esther Chan)
Love Story
Circle Game
A Carnation for Rebu
Both Sides Now
Your Song
Kisses Sweeter Than Wine (co-sung with Michael Hui)
All I Ever Need is You (co-sung with Frances Yip)
Once There Was a Love
If I Were a Carpenter (co-sung with Michael Hui)
My Sweet Lord
Vincent
When I'm Sixty Four (co-sung with Michael Hui)
Morning Has Broken
Look What They've Done To My Song
Until It's Time For you To Go
Too Beautiful to Last
Beautiful in the Rain
Interlude
Windy
Call Me
Downtown
Music To Watch Girls By
Do You know the Way to San Jose
My Cherry Amour
I Say A Little Prayer
Just a River Separating the Horizon (只是一水隔天涯) + Trace of Love
What the World Needs Now is Love
Lingyun Tower (鐵塔凌雲)
Puppy Song (co-sung with Michael Hui)
For All We Know (co-sung with Rebecca Fleming)

References

1970s Hong Kong television series
1971 Hong Kong television series debuts
1973 Hong Kong television series endings
Hong Kong television sitcoms
TVB original programming
Television sketch shows
Cantonese-language television shows